Joseph Esrey Johnson (February 5, 1843 - April 30, 1911) was an American soldier and recipient of the Medal of Honor who earned the award for his actions in the American Civil War.

Biography 
Johnson was born in Lower Merion, Pennsylvania on February 5, 1843. He served as a first lieutenant with Company A of the 58th Pennsylvania Infantry. He earned his medal in action at Fort Harrison, Virginia on September 29, 1864. By the end of the war, Johnson had reached the rank of brevet major. His medal was issued on April 1, 1898. Johnson died on April 30, 1911, and is now buried in Arlington National Cemetery, Virginia.

Medal of Honor Citation 
For extraordinary heroism on 29 September 1864, in action at Fort Harrison, Virginia. Though twice severely wounded while advancing in the assault, First Lieutenant Johnson disregarded his injuries and was among the first to enter the fort, where he was wounded for the third time.

References 

1843 births
1911 deaths
American Civil War recipients of the Medal of Honor
Union Army officers
Burials at Arlington National Cemetery